The 2014 Champions League Twenty20 (CLT20) was the sixth edition of Champions League Twenty20, an international Twenty20 cricket tournament. It was held in India from 13 September to 4 October 2014.

Mumbai Indians were the defending champions but failed  to qualify. The final was played on 4 October 2014, the Chennai Super Kings won their 2nd CLT20 title after defeating Kolkata Knight Riders in the final by 8 wickets chasing a total of 181. Suresh Raina scored unbeaten 109*off 62 balls.

Format

Prize money
The total prize money of $6 million will be distributed among the Champions League T20 participating tWinners
 $1.3 million – Runners-up
 $500,000 – Losing semifinalists
 $200,000 – Team finishing 5th to 10th

Qualification

Teams

Squads

On 22 August 2014, the 12 participating teams announced their final 15-man squads for the tournament.

Qualifying stage

  Advanced to Group A
  Advanced to Group B

Fixtures

Group stage

Group A

 Advanced to semifinals

Fixtures

Group B

 Advanced to semifinals

Fixtures

Knockout stage

Fixtures
Semifinals

The Final

Final standings

Statistics

Most runs
The following are the top five highest run scorers in the main tournament.

Source: Golden Bat

 The leading run-scorer of the main tournament awarded the Golden Bat award.

Most wickets
The following are the five leading wicket-takers of the main tournament.

Source: Golden Wicket

 The leading wicket-taker of the tournament awarded the Golden Wicket award.

References

External links
 CLT20 2014
 CLT20 2014 on Wisden India
 Champions League Twenty20 2014 on ESPN Cricinfo

Champions League Twenty20
2014 in cricket
Champions League Twenty20